First the Egg is a New York Times bestselling children's picture book written and illustrated by Laura Vaccaro Seeger, published by Roaring Book Press in 2007. It was a Caldecott Honor Book in 2008 and also appeared on the New York Times Best Illustrated Children's Books list and the American Library Association Notable Children's Books list.

The book comprises a series of die-cut pages that convey various forms of transformation. Seeger uses word play and alters the composition of the illustrations between cut-outs to create unexpected relationships among basic concepts such as time, opposites, and colors. In 2009, the company Weston Woods Studios, Inc. made a version of the book, narrated by Elle Fanning, with music by Jack Sundrud and Rusty Young

Reception
Publishers Weekly described First the Egg as "another nimble page-turner...", and Inis magazine called it "whimsical and bold..."

Awards and honors
 New York Times Best Illustrated Children's Books (2007)
 Caldecott Honor Book (2008)
 American Library Association Notable Children's Books (2008)

References

American picture books
2007 children's books
Caldecott Honor-winning works